Paula Heimann (née Klatzko; 2 February 1899 – 22 October 1982) was a German psychiatrist and psychoanalyst, who established the phenomenon of countertransference as an important tool of psychoanalytic treatment.

Life in Germany 

Born into a Jewish family which migrated from Russia, after studying medicine in Königsberg, Berlin, and Frankfurt, Paula Klatzko took and passed her Staatsexamen (state exams) in Breslau. There she met her future husband, the physician Franz Heimann. Together they went to Heidelberg where she trained to be a psychiatrist from 1924–1927. She wrote her doctoral dissertation in 1925. Their daughter Mirza was born that same year. In 1927, the Heimann family moved to Berlin, where she began her psychoanalytic training under Theodor Reik in 1929. Together with her husband she was a member of the International Society of Doctors Against War.

Emigration and work in the United Kingdom 

In 1933, Heimann's husband had to leave Germany because of his political views. He emigrated to Switzerland; however, Paula Heimann and her daughter were not permitted to do so. Thus mother and daughter emigrated to London.

In 1934 Heimann became Melanie Klein's secretary. In 1935 they started working together on analysis and became close associates. She passed the state medical examination in Edinburgh in 1938. That year she became a member of the British Psychoanalytical Society with her lecture A contribution to the problem of sublimation. Her article On counter-transference, presented at the Psychoanalytical Congress in 1949 in Zurich, led to a rift with the Kleinian group of analysts because she presented a different view of the importance of countertransference. Melanie Klein saw it only as a problem of the therapeutic process. Paula Heimann, however, saw the emotional reaction of the therapist to their patient as an important tool for the exploration of the latter's unconscious. She then turned to the Independents group and was Margarete Mitscherlich's analyst during 1958–59.  Alexander Mitscherlich also underwent training analysis with her.

Works 
 
 About Children and Children-No-Longer, HG: Margaret Tonnesmann, Vol 10. In The New Library of Psychoanalysis, Published by Routledge (Taylor & Francis Group) 1990, 
 Bemerkungen zur Sublimierung ("Comments on sublimation"). In Psychologie des Ich ("Psychology of the self"), Wissenschaftliche Buchgesellschaft, Darmstadt 1974

Notes

References 

 Simone Zimansl: Paula Heimann. In Gerhard Stumm (Ed.), Personenlexikon der Psychotherapie ("Encyclopedia of Psychotherapists"). Vienna / New York 2005, p. 207 f., 
 Pearl King, Paula Heimann's quest for her own identity as a psychoanalyst: an introductory memoir
 Rolnik, E.J. (2008). “Why is it that I See Everything Differently?” Reading a 1933 Letter from Paula Heimann to Theodor Reik. J. Amer. Psychoanal. Assn., 56(2):409–430

External links 

Biography and list of works
The biographical dictionary of female psychoanalysts: Paula Heimann.
Biography in Personenlexikon der Psychotherapie ("Encyclopedia of Psychotherapists")

1899 births
1982 deaths
British Jews
British psychiatrists
British women psychiatrists
British psychoanalysts
German psychiatrists
German psychoanalysts
Heidelberg University alumni
Object relations theorists
German women psychiatrists
20th-century German Jews